Yangasso is a small town and commune in the Cercle of Bla in the Ségou Region of southern-central Mali. As of 1998 the commune had a population of 14,456.

On 21 December 1915, a column of Senegalese Tirailleurs of the French Army was defeated here in a battle of the Volta-Bani War.

References

Communes of Ségou Region